Twist and Shout was the Beatles' second album released in Canada, in mono by Capitol Records (catalogue number T-6054) on 3 February 1964. It consists of songs mostly drawn from Please Please Me, their first LP released in the United Kingdom. This album, like its parent album, contains both original Beatles songs, as well as covers (including its namesake, "Twist and Shout"), denoted in the track listing.

Track listing

Differences from Please Please Me
"I Saw Her Standing There" (the opening track of Please Please Me) and "Misery" were omitted from Twist and Shout. They both appear on the next Canadian LP release, The Beatles' Long Tall Sally. 
"From Me to You" and "She Loves You" were added to Twist and Shout. They were issued as the A-sides of singles in the UK.
 The two albums' front and back covers differ significantly.

Reissues
Twist and Shout received miscellaneous reissues since the initial release date. The initial release was exclusively mono audio, because stereo record players were not popular in Canada at the time of release and therefore not profitable. Early copies of the record were manufactured with a limited edition 8x10 inch poster of the Beatles. The subsequent reissues attributed Parr's, the printer commissioned by Capitol to create the cardboard record jackets as well as other minor variations in the label, font size, and catalogue numbers. Twist and Shout was eventually reissued in stereo in the 1970s, bearing catalogue number ST-6054 to denote stereo audio; all tracks were in stereo except for "Love Me Do", "P.S. I Love You", and "She Loves You", which remained mono. The stereo reissue is considered to be the definitive version.

Certifications

References

External links
Beatles LPs at Capitol6000
The Beatles in Canada
http://www.capitol6000.com/beatlesdiscs.html
https://www.discogs.com/The-Beatles-Twist-And-Shout/master/230677
https://www.discogs.com/The-Beatles-Twist-And-Shout/release/1883169

1964 albums
Albums produced by George Martin
The Beatles albums
Capitol Records albums